Pierre Bruchez (born 2 July 1985) is a Swiss ski mountaineer.

Selected results 
 2003:
 1st (juniors), Trophée des Gastlosenm together with Toni Niggli
 2004:
 1st, Trophée des Gastlosen, together with Alain Richard
 3rd, World Championship relay race (together with Alexander Hug, Alain Richard and Rico Elmer
 2005:
 1st (espoirs), Trophée des Gastlosen, together with Alain Richard
 2008:
 2nd, World Championship relay race (together with Martin Anthamatten, Florent Troillet and Didier Moret
 10th, World Championship vertical race
 2nd, Trophée des Gastlosen, together with Didier Moret
 2009:
 3rd, European Championship relay race (together with Florent Troillet, Marcel Marti and Yannick Ecoeur)
 5th, Trofeo Mezzalama (together with Didier Moret and Ernest Farquet)
 9th, Pierra Menta (together with Yannick Ecoeur)
 2010:
 2nd, World Championship relay race (together with Florent Troillet, Martin Anthamatten and Yannick Ecoeur)

Patrouille des Glaciers 

 2006: 6th "senior I" class ranking, together with Mathieu Charvoz and Alain Richard
 2008: 7th and 1st in the international military teams ranking, together with Cpl Yannick Ecoeur and Garde-frontière Marcel Marti
 2010: 5th, together with Didier Moret and Marcel Marti

External links 
 Pierre Bruchez at Skimountaineering.org

References 

1985 births
Living people
Swiss male ski mountaineers
Swiss military patrol (sport) runners